(Kyabje) Choden Rinpoche (in full,  (May 31, (Tibetan New Year) 1930 Rong-bo district, Kham, eastern Tibet – September 11, 2015) was a contemporary yogi-scholar of the Gelugpa school of Tibetan Buddhism and a reincarnation ('sprul-sku') of the Choden lineage, the historical abbots of Rabten Monastery ( in Rong-bo district, Kham.

The late Choden Rinpoche, Losang Gyalten Jigdrel Wangchuk (lit. "Teaching of the victorious Losang [blo-bzang rgyal-bstan], fearless [jig-bral] sovereign [dbang-phyug]") has been known amongst his peers and students as "master of the five sciences" (viz. medicine, craftsmanship, logic, grammar and the inner science of Buddhism), as extraordinary scholar of Tibetan Buddhism, yogic practitioner, and for being gentle, kind and compassionate. Kyabje Choden Rinpoche was a lineage-holder of rare and sought-after transmissions of the Tantrayana.

Family background and early life
Choden Rinpoche was born near Rabten Monastery, Rong-bo (Kham) into a "family of (minor) nobility", (euphemistically rendered post-1959 as "family of an official") that consisted of nine sons and five daughters. He was recognized at age three as the third Chöden Tulku, i.e. as reincarnation of the previous Chöden Rinpoche, Losang Chöden, a locally renowned yogi and abbot of Rong-po monastery who in turn had been one of the candidates for recognition as the 12th Dalai Lama, Trinley Gyatso. According to Geshe Tseten Gelek of Sera Jé—long time assistant to Kyabje Chöden Rinpoche—Rinpoche's third eldest brother, Geshe Thubten Yarphel was a prolific scholar-practitioner and composed over fifty volumes of commentary on sutra and tantra and rose to local prominence especially as a teacher of the Kālacakra tradition before passing away in 1997. The second eldest brother was reportedly "able to recite the Buddhist scriptures without even seeing them". Kyabje Choden Rinpoche himself displayed similar feats of accelerated memorization, supposedly retaining prayers and scriptures with minimal effort and in only a fraction of the time generally required. As a young child, the young reincarnate Lama displayed remarkable inclinations, such giving Dharma teachings in play, and imitating the administration of traditional Tibetan Medicine to other children.

Education
Shortly after his recognition as the reincarnation of Chöden Rinpoche Lobsang Tulku, the previous abbot of Rong-po monastery, his uncle began tutoring the young lama. Kyabje Choden Rinpoche relates about this period:

The meeting with Pabongkha Rinpoche reportedly left a lasting impression:

When he was 15 years old, the young lama followed Pabongkha's counsel to enrol in Sera monastery and left his native Kham for the regional "college" allotted by geographical provenance, Lhopa Khangtsen, together with his brother, (Geshe) Thubten Yarphel. At Sera monastery, Rinpoche did extremely well, despite well-documented hardships, and relative poverty. Amongst the remarkable feats accomplished by the young aspirant was the memorization of "thousands of pages of philosophical texts, including the entire text Golden Garland of Elogquence by Tsongkhapa, a sprawling twelve-hundred-page commentary on the perfection of wisdom sutras. He consistently topped his class in debate and periodically attended teachings on lamrim and tantra by contemporary luminaries like Pari Rinpoche, Trijang Rinpoche, and Ling Rinpoche."  Rinpoche "was in the same class as Geshe Sopa Rinpoche, Geshe Ugyen Tseten and Geshe Legden for two or three years." 
Although the chief pursuit at Sera monastery was the exoteric curriculum of Buddhist philosophy as transmitted via the (Five) Great Treatises , Rinpoche "also studied auxiliary subjects like Sanskrit, poetry, and astrology with a private tutor in Lhasa".

While enrolled in the Geshe Lharam class,

Debating partner to the 14th Dalai Lama

Choden Rinpoche was chosen to serve as one of two debating-partners hailing from Sera monastery for the occasion of the XIVth Dalai Lama's public Geshe-examinations in 1959 for the topics of the "Two Truths". Despite an interlude of many years, when reunited in exile, both the Dalai Lama and Kyabje Chöden Rinpoche remembered the episode with fondness and in detail—according to Rinpoche, the Dalai Lama displayed a nimble mind and remarkable acuity during the examinations.

The fourteenth Dalai Lama, in turn recounted:

1959 and its aftermath: in solitary retreat for 19 years (1965-1985)

Observing the restrictive political developments manifesting at the outset of the Cultural Revolution, Choden Rinpoche decided to withdraw from his public activities and the duties of a senior reincarnate Lama and instead to devote his time to extended solitary retreat. His motivation, he explained in early summer of 2000, was to practice the Buddhist meditation sincerely, and to realize, in practice, what he has learned in theory during his studies at Sera monastery:

Choden Rinpoche incepted his solitary retreat phase with the practice of "Taking the Essence" (Chulen). This came to be in response to the local administrator's instruction to Rinpoche "if you can practice Dharma without having to rely on other people for food or clothing, then you can practice". Rinpoche described this initial phase in the following manner:

Thereafter, Rinpoche, being forced to abort his Chulen practice by dint of governmental changes in policy, began to live in Lhasa until about 1964, "doing the main practices of Guhyasamaja, Yamantaka and Heruka, and giving some teachings where I could."

According to Geshe Gyalten Choden Rinpoche was able to accomplish the feat of completing a retreat of 19 years despite the onset of the Cultural Revolution, lasting from 1965 until 1985 by living in a small room in Rinpoche's cousin's house "without coming out". Choden Rinpoche was able to do so by feigning to be an invalid:

Displaying characteristic humility, Rinpoche recounted the period in the following manner

1985: Teaching activity in India begins

Rinpoche travelled to India in 1985, where, upon consultation with the fourteenth Dalai Lama, he briefly taught in Nepal before settling down at the Lhopa Khangtsen "regional college" of Sera Jé Monastery in Bylakuppe, South India. Functioning primarily as instructor for philosophical debate, Rinpoche unabatedly persevered in his personal practice and study. During that time,

1998: Teaching in the West

Rinpoche continued to emphasize practice and teaching after taking up teaching activities in the West at the behest of the Dalai Lama and Lama Zopa Rinpoche during the year of 1998. Though Rinpoche was much sought after as a traditional teacher, when the opportunity arose, Rinpoche fulfilled specific requests forwarded by his students to the best of His ability, such as granting ordination or visiting correctional facilities.
From 1998 to 2013, Rinpoche dedicated most of the year to touring worldwide in order to impart the Dharma, and consistently returned to Sera monastery at the end of the year to give extensive public teachings to thousands of monks.

Preservation of the Legacy

In 2010, Geshe Gyalten founded Awakening Vajra International (Visit Official website) at the request of his teacher as a network of internationally associated Dharma Centers in order to provide a platform for Kyabje Choden Rinpoche's teaching activities in the West. As of 2015, Awakening Vajra International, under the spiritual direction of Geshe Gyalten is entrusted with the preservation and cultivation of Kyabje Choden Rinpoche's legacy and life achievement. Note that there is also a dedicated Tibetan Language website, as well as a Vietnamese Language web presence associated with AVI.

Final years and transition

Although Kyabje Choden Rinpoche's health was gradually waning from July 2014 C.E. onwards, Rinpoche steadfastly persisted in giving major teachings in Sera Jé monastery, and even attended the great Lam Rim teachings given by the Dalai Lama. A final meeting between the Dalai Lama and Rinpoche was arranged in Delhi on 29 August 2015, on November 3rd, 2015, the Dalai Lama composed a  
Despite Rinpoche's severe illness, there was not a single day in Rinpoche's life that he would miss a meditation or recitation commitment, and right until the day of Rinpoche's death, he was engaged with extensive prayers and rituals. Geshe Tenzin Namdak relates in an open letter:

Jangtse Chöje Losang Tenzin Rinpoche presided over Rinpoche's cremation that was supported by a congregation of monks from Gyütö tantric college on September 15 at Lhopa Khangtsen of Sera Jé. On September 19, Gen Thubten Rinchen guided the process of opening the cremation stupa. Rinpoche's close students have captured these final days by way of a succinct audio-visual documentation.

Rinpoche's final words, as transmitted by Geshe Gyalten Kunga and Geshe Tenzin Namdak, were "mainly it is important to remember the kindness of the Buddha and abide in that remembrance", and added a verse from Ārya Nāgārjuna's Five Stages of Guhyasamāja:

In the final meeting between the fourteenth Dalai Lama and Choden Rinpoche, the Dalai Lama shared his impression that

The transition and cremation ceremony, held in Sept. 2015 at Sera Jé Monastery in India has been in a short audio-visual contribution.

Selection of Major Works translated into English
 .
 .
 .

Resources for his students 

Before showing the aspect of passing away, Rinpoche advised his students to recite the prayer "Chanting the Names of Manjushri" and other prayers in preparation of his rebirth in a new reincarnation.

Vietnamese students have produced a short Vietnamese language documentary of "H.E. Choden Rinpoche's holy relic tour in Vietnam", and an oral account of H.E. Choden Rinpoche's life, entitled "the life of a great Yogi - H.E. Choden Rinpoche,  as given by his long-year attendant, Geshe Gyalten Kunga, has been recorded.

Notes

References

External links
 Official Webpage of AVI Ananda Dharma Center, CA, USA
 Official Webpage of Awakening Vajra
 Tibetan Language Webpage associated with Awakening Vajra International
 The Outer, "common" Biography (In Tibetan)
 The Special, "uncommon" Biography (In Tibetan)
 Kurukulla Center Official Webpage (FPMT)
 Vietnamese Webpage
 Public Lecture: "The Life of A Great Yogi H.E. Choden Rinpoche" by Geshe Gyalten Kungka (AVI)
 Biography of Choden Rinpoche provided by the FPMT
 Choden Rinpoche Dharma Teachings

1930 births
Buddhist monks from Tibet
Rinpoches
Tibetan Buddhists from Tibet
2015 deaths